Lecithocera syntropha is a moth in the family Lecithoceridae. It was described by Edward Meyrick in 1918. It is found in north-western India and Himachal Pradesh.

The wingspan is about 15 mm. The forewings are dark fuscous and the hindwings are light grey.

References

Moths described in 1918
syntropha